Herbert ("Bert") Vernon Foord (22 December 1930, in Appleby, Westmorland – 31 July 2001, in Stoke Mandeville, Buckinghamshire) was an English meteorologist and BBC weather forecaster during the 1960s and early 1970s.

The son of a Royal Navy serviceman, Foord attended grammar school and joined the UK Meteorological Office as a trainee forecaster in 1947. His first posting was to the Eskdalemuir Observatory in the Scottish borders, where he worked between 1950 and 1953, followed by three years' service on the Atlantic weather ships. He became the principal BBC weather forecaster in 1963, and his low-key presentation style made him a national institution.

One of the highlights of his career came in 1969 during the BBC coverage of the Apollo 12 mission, when he predicted that the spacecraft could face some turbulence on take-off and might be struck by lightning. Within half an hour, lightning struck the spacecraft.

Foord left the BBC in 1973, by which time his celebrity had led to the distinction of being a guest on Roy Plomley's  Desert Island Discs. He became principal forecaster for the Royal Air Force Strike Command. In 1980, he became the subject of a "Bring Back Bert Foord" campaign started by presenter Terry Wogan, who complained the British weather had become worse since Foord stopped presenting the forecasts.

Foord's off-screen persona was quite different from his media image, being relaxed, jovial and outgoing (he ran the London Marathon in 1987). He retired from the Met Office in 1990, and died 11 years later.

Personal life
He lived in Loosley Row, in the former Wycombe District of Buckinghamshire.

References

External links
BBC profile of Bert Foord

1930 births
2001 deaths
BBC weather forecasters
English meteorologists
People from Appleby-in-Westmorland
People from Wycombe District